Fiona Devine CBE FAcSS (born 6 June 1962) is a professor of sociology at the University of Manchester and head of Manchester Business School.

Education 
Devine's degrees, master's and doctorate were all gained from the University of Essex.

Career 
Devine is best known for sociology writings about a new model of class structures: seven classes ranging from the Elite at the top to a Precariat at the bottom. She collaborated with the BBC website BBC Lab UK on the Great British Class Survey. More generally Devine specialises in social stratification and mobility; class identity; and in gender, work and family. She is co-director of the Centre for Research on Socio-Cultural Change at Manchester.

Awards 
She was awarded an OBE for Services to Social Sciences in 2010 and elected to the Academy of Social Sciences in 2011. She was appointed a Commander of the Order of the British Empire in the 2019 New Year Honours for services to the Social Sciences.

Selected bibliography

Books

Book chapters

Journal articles 
 
  
  (Monograph series.)

References

External links
Profile: Manchester Business School

Living people
Academics of the University of Manchester
Alumni of the University of Essex
British sociologists
1962 births
Fellows of the Academy of Social Sciences
Officers of the Order of the British Empire
Commanders of the Order of the British Empire
British women sociologists